The canton of Craonne is a former administrative division in northern France. It was disbanded following the French canton reorganisation which came into effect in March 2015. It had 6,085 inhabitants (2012).

The canton comprised the following communes:

Aizelles
Aubigny-en-Laonnois
Beaurieux
Berrieux
Bouconville-Vauclair
Bourg-et-Comin
Braye-en-Laonnois
Cerny-en-Laonnois
Chamouille
Chermizy-Ailles
Colligis-Crandelain
Corbeny
Craonne
Craonnelle
Cuiry-lès-Chaudardes
Cuissy-et-Geny
Goudelancourt-lès-Berrieux
Jumigny
Lierval
Martigny-Courpierre
Monthenault
Moulins
Moussy-Verneuil
Neuville-sur-Ailette
Œuilly
Oulches-la-Vallée-Foulon
Paissy
Pancy-Courtecon 
Pargnan
Sainte-Croix
Saint-Thomas
Trucy
Vassogne
Vendresse-Beaulne

Demographics

See also
Cantons of the Aisne department

References

Former cantons of Aisne
2015 disestablishments in France
States and territories disestablished in 2015